Owzun Darreh (also Romanized as Owzūn Darreh, Ozūn Darreh, Ūzondarreh, Ūzūn Darreh, and Uzun-Darrekh; also known as Azūndezeh) is a village in Eqbal-e Gharbi Rural District, in the Central District of Qazvin County, Qazvin Province, Iran. At the 2006 census, its population was 269, in 73 families.

References 

Populated places in Qazvin County